The 1971 National Football League was the 13th season of the National Football League. It was won by Hellenic.

Table

References

National Football League (South Africa)
National Football League (South Africa)
South Africa, NFL
South Africa, NFL